The Invisible Wall may refer to: 
 The Invisible Wall (1944 film), a Swedish drama film directed by Gustaf Molander
 The Invisible Wall (1947 film), an American noir film directed by 	Eugene Forde
 The Invisible Wall (1991 film), an Italian drama film directed by Marco Risi
 The Invisible Wall (memoir), a 2007 memoir by American author Harry Bernstein
 "The Invisible Wall", a song by Japanese band  The Gazette

See also
Invisible wall